Michel Winock (born 19 March 1937) is a French historian, specializing in the history of the French Republic, intellectual movements, antisemitism, nationalism and the far right movements of France. He is a professeur des universités in contemporary history at the Institut d'Etudes Politiques de Paris (Sciences-Po) and member of L'Histoire magazine's editing board. Winock has also worked as a reporter for Le Monde.

Winock is the author of Siècle des intellectuels (Century of Intellectuals, 1997), for which he received the Prix Médicis in 1997 in the essay category. He also wrote Voix de la liberté (Voice of Liberty, 2001), acknowledged by the Académie française, and directed the Dictionnaire des intellectuels français with Jacques Juillard. He won the 2010 Prix Goncourt de la Biographie for Madame de Stael.

Biography 
Winock became doctor of letters achieving his agrégation d'histoire in 1961. He started his career in secondary school teaching at the lycée in Montpellier, then at the Lycée Hoche in Versailles and the lycée Lakanal in Sceaux. The creation of the University of Vincennes following the Faure reform of 1968 opened the doors of higher education to him. Winock also led a career as an editor. He was member of the Esprit magazine from 1964, and became an adviser, then literary director to Éditions du Seuil. In 1978, a year after leaving Esprit, he founded L'Histoire magazine with the aim of making the best historical research accessible to the public. Author of about 40 works, Winock is today one of the most prolific and esteemed French historians.

Winock was one of the initiators of the Liberté pour l'histoire (freedom for history) petition. Winock participated in the administrative council of the association with the same name.

Bibliography 
Madame de Stael, 2010
La Gauche en France, 2006
La Mêlée présidentielle, 2007
Clémenceau, 2007
1958. La naissance de la Ve République, coll. "Découvertes Gallimard" (n° 525), 2008
L'Élection présidentielle en France, 2008
Le XXe siècle idéologique et politique, 2009
L'Agonie de la IVème République, 2006
Pierre Mendès France, 2005
Histoire de la France politique, 2004 (sous la dir.)
La France et les juifs, de 1789 à nos jours, 2004.
La Belle Epoque : la France de 1900 à 1914, 2003
La France politique : XIXe-XXe siècle, 2003
Dictionnaire des intellectuels français : les personnes, les lieux, les moments, 2002 (sous la dir.)
Les voix de la liberté : les écrivains engagés au XIXe siècle, 2001
Le siècle des intellectuels, 1997
La droite depuis 1789 : les hommes, les idées, les réseaux, 1995
Histoire de l'Extrême droite en France, 1993 (sous la dir.)
Le Socialisme en France et en Europe, 1992
Les frontières vives, journal de l'année 1991, 1992
L'échec au roi : 1791-1792, 1991
Nationalisme, fascisme, antisémitisme en France, 1990
1789, l'année sans pareille, 1989
Chronique des années soixante, 1987
La fièvre hexagonale : les grandes crises politiques de 1871 à 1968, 1986
Édouard Drumont et Cie, antisémitisme et fascisme en France, 1982
La gauche en France depuis 1900, 1981 (with Jean Touchard)
La république se meurt : 1956-1958, 1978
Histoire politique de la revue Esprit, 1975
La IIIe République : 1870-1940, 1970 (with Jean-Pierre Azéma)
Les Communards, 1964 (with Jean-Pierre Azéma)

References 

20th-century French historians
21st-century French historians
Historians of France
Intellectual historians
French magazine founders
French biographers
Lycée Lakanal alumni
Academic staff of Sciences Po
Prix Médicis essai winners
Prix Goncourt de la Biographie winners
French male non-fiction writers
Chevaliers of the Légion d'honneur
Writers from Paris
1937 births
Living people
Lycée Lakanal teachers
Academics and writers on far-right extremism
Scholars of antisemitism